The United States national badminton team represents the United States in international badminton team competitions. The national team is controlled by the governing body for badminton in the country, USA Badminton. The woman's team has won a total of 3 consecutive titles in the Uber Cup from 1957 to 1963. 

The men's team were runners-up at the 1952 edition of the Thomas Cup where they lost to Malaya. 

In individual events, the United States has won 1 gold medal in the BWF World Championships. It was won by Howard Bach and Tony Gunawan in the 2005 edition held in Anaheim, California.

World Championships medal table
Updated after XXVI edition (2021), does not include one stripped silver medal from 2014.

List of medalists

Participation in BWF competitions
The United States has won 3 times in the Uber Cup and were runners up at the 1966 edition.

Thomas Cup

Uber Cup

Sudirman Cup

Participation in Pan American Badminton Championships

Men's team
{| class="wikitable"
|-
! Year !! Result
|-
| 2004 ||  Champions
|-
| 2006 ||  Champions
|-
| 2008 ||  Runner-up
|-
| 2010 || Fourth place
|-
|style="border: 3px solid red"| 2012 ||  Champions
|-
| 2016 || Fourth place
|-
| 2018 ||  Runner-up
|-
| 2020 ||  Third place
|-
| 2022 || Fourth place
|}Women's teamMixed team'''

Notable players 

 Judy Devlin
 Susan Devlin
 Margaret Varner
 Beiwen Zhang
 Ethel Marshall
 Paula Lynn Obañana
 Jennie Gai
 Timothy Lam
 Vinson Chiu
 Lauren Lam

 Marten Mendez
 David G. Freeman
 T. Wynn Rogers
 Howard Shu
 Philip Chew
 Ryan Chew
 Sattawat Pongnairat
 Joshua Yuan
 Howard Bach
 Tony Gunawan

Current squad 
The following players were selected to represent the United States at the 2022 Thomas & Uber Cup.

Male players
Enrico Asuncion
Don Henley Averia
William Hu
Adrian King-Sun Mar
Henry Tang

Female players
Natalie Chi
Francesca Corbett
Jennie Gai
Lauren Lam
Allison Lee
Kodi Tang Lee
Sanchita Pandey
Esther Shi

References

Badminton
National badminton teams
Badminton in the United States